Roseland is an unincorporated community in Kandiyohi County, Minnesota, United States. It was settled in 1926 by Dutch Immigrants. It grew from its founding until the 1960s because of its railroad. It was once a popular place to play baseball, but the baseball field was replaced by houses.

Notes

Unincorporated communities in Kandiyohi County, Minnesota
Unincorporated communities in Minnesota